HMS Cochrane was a  armoured cruiser built for the Royal Navy in the first decade of the 20th century. She served in the 2nd Cruiser Squadron during the First World War under Rear-Admiral Herbert Heath, taking part in the Battle of Jutland in 1916. She was based in Murmansk in mid-1918 during the Allied intervention in the Russian Civil War. She became stranded in the River Mersey on 14 November 1918 and broke in two. The wreck was broken up in place by June 1919.

Description

The engines were powered by 19 Yarrow water-tube boilers and six cylindrical boilers.

Her main armament consisted of six BL  Mark X guns in single Mk V turrets distributed in two centreline turrets, one each fore and aft of the superstructure, and four turrets disposed in the corners about the funnels. Her secondary armament of four BL  Mark II or Mark V guns in single Mk II turrets was carried amidships, between the wing 9.2-inch guns. Twenty-six Vickers QF 3 pounders were fitted, ten on turret roofs and eight each on the forward and aft superstructures. The last four ships of the  cruisers had a secondary armament of turreted 7.5-inch guns rather than the  guns in open barbettes of the first two ships; these latter four were sometimes referred to as the Warrior class. Because of the extra topweight of the turrets in comparison to their half-sisters their stability was reduced which made them very good seaboats and steady gun platforms.

Wartime modifications
A single Hotchkiss QF 6-pounder anti-aircraft gun on a high-angle Mark Ic mounting was mounted on the quarterdeck in 1915. It had a maximum depression of 8° and a maximum elevation of 60°. It was replaced by a QF 3 inch 20 cwt guns on a high-angle Mark II mount in 1916. This gun had a maximum depression of 10° and a maximum elevation of 90°. A pair of Vickers QF 3 pounder on HA Mark III mountings were probably installed amidships during 1915–16. They could elevate to +80° and depress to -5°.

The guns on top of 'A' and 'Y' turrets were removed in 1915–16. The aftermost 3-pounder guns on the superstructure were removed during 1917 as well as the guns on top of the forward 9.2-inch wing turrets. This reduced her total to twenty 3-pounder guns, excluding the AA guns. Some of these guns were landed at Murmansk while she was based there. Seventeen 3-pounders were on board when she was lost in 1919, but it is unclear if that total includes the AA guns. Cochranes foremast was converted to a tripod mast to support the weight of a fire-control director in 1917, but the director was not actually fitted until August 1918.

Construction and career
Cochrane was laid down on 24 March 1904 and launched on 28 May 1905 at Fairfield Shipbuilding and Engineering, Govan, Scotland. The ship was commissioned with a nucleus crew on 18 February 1907 and cost £1,193,121. She "joined the Nore Division of the Home Fleet on 6 March 1907 and shortly afterwards was brought into full commission for service with the 5th Cruiser Squadron. On 1 April 1909 she recommissioned for service with the 2nd Cruiser Squadron with which she remained until September 1917." She escorted the Royal Yacht Medina in 1911–1912. Cochrane, accompanied by her sister  and three other armoured cruisers were sent to reinforce the defences of the Shetland Islands on 2 August 1914, days before the start of the First World War. She, and her squadron, were assigned to the Grand Fleet for most of the First World War. However, the ship remained unengaged throughout the battle, and did not fire her 9.2 or 7.5-inch guns at all.

Cochrane was transferred to the North America and West Indies Station in November 1917, but rejoined the 2nd Cruiser Squadron early in 1918. She was based in Murmansk between March and September 1918 during the Allied intervention in the Russian Civil War. She ferried Soviet troops to Pechenga on 3 May to forestall an attempt by White Finns to seize the town. On 14 November 1918 she was stranded in the Mersey Estuary, while under the control of the pilot, and later broke in two, becoming a total loss. The wreck had been broken up in situ by June 1919.

Footnotes

References

External links
 
Battle of Jutland Crew Lists Project - HMS Cochrane Crew List

 

Warrior-class cruisers
Ships built on the River Clyde
World War I cruisers of the United Kingdom
Ships built in Govan
1905 ships
Shipwrecks in the Irish Sea
Maritime incidents in 1918